The women's shot put event  at the 1980 European Athletics Indoor Championships was held on 1 March in Sindelfingen.

Results

References

Shot put at the European Athletics Indoor Championships
Shot
Euro